Ditte & Louise is a Danish comedy series that aired in DR1. The series is written and developed by Ditte Hansen and Louise Mieritz. It aired from 2015 to 2016 and was followed by the film of the same name released in 2018, developed by Nordisk Film.

Plot
The series depicts Ditte and Louise's time in the acting industry, where they fight against chauvinistic and sexist tendencies.

Cast
Ditte Hansen - Ditte
Louise Mieritz - Louise
Henrik Vestergaard - Thomas
Sasha Sofie Lund - Tilde
Solbjørg Højfeldt - Inger, Louise's mother
Viggo Korf-Hansen - Bjørn
Henrik Noél Olesen - Arnold
Jakob Cedergren - Sebastian
Jesper Christensen - Ib

In addition, a series has a large number of guest appearances, including from Trine Dyrholm, Iben Hjejle, Lars Mikkelsen, Mia Lyhne, Joachim B. Olsen, and Keld and Hilda Heick.

Production
Ditte & Louise was the first comedy series to be launched on DR1 in fifteen years, as the genre has been a more important element on its sister channel DR2. The production budget for one season amounted to 14 million kroner. The series draws inspiration from works like Klovn, Ridley Scott's Thelma & Louise, as well as Christian Braad Thomsen's Koks i kulissen with Helle Ryslinge and Anne Marie Helger.

Prior to the series, Hansen and Mieritz had collaborated as hosts of the Bodil Prize Party and as screenwriters for Cirkusrevyen. They have also worked on the play Den Vægelsindede which premiered at Odense Teater the same year as their series was aired.

Broadcast
The series was launched on DR's main channel DR1, where it was shown on Friday at 21:25 (9:25 pm), seen in the industry as prime-time. The first season received a Robert Award for Best Short Television Series. Ditte Hansen and Louise Mieritz were in the process of developing a third season when DR1's channel manager chose to withdraw support for the series, based on its viewership. It was met with criticism from several media, including from Information who called the decision self-ironic. Mieritz expressed her surprise at the decision, as the series had performed solidly on streaming services.

Episodes

Season 1
All episodes of the first season are written by Hansen and Mieritz, and directed by Niclas Bendixen. The first season was launched on 5 June 2015 and ran for the next seven weeks.

Season 2
All episodes of the second season are written by Hansen and Mieritz, and directed by Niclas Bendixen. The first two episodes were shown on DR1 on 4 November 2016, after which the entire season was made available online.

References

External links

Danish comedy television series
2010s Danish television series
2015 Danish television series debuts
DR TV original programming